Senator Reid may refer to:

 Albert Reid (1887–1962), former senator from New South Wales
 Clarence A. Reid (1892–1978), Michigan State Senate
 David Settle Reid (1813–1891), North Carolina State Senate
 Harry Reid (1939-2021), former U.S. Senator from Nevada
 Matthew Reid (politician) (1856–1947), former Senator from Queensland
 Stuart Reid (politician) (fl. 1980s–2010s), Utah State Senate

See also
Senator Read (disambiguation)
Senator Reed (disambiguation)